John Alexander McKay (born 1945) was a politician from Northern Ireland.

McKay was an Ulster Unionist Party member of the Northern Ireland Constitutional Convention for Fermanagh and South Tyrone. McKay had finished seventh overall in the election but was elected thanks to transfers from fellow United Ulster Unionist Council candidate David Calvert, who was not elected to the body despite finishing above McKay on first preferences. The election was determined through the single transferable vote model.

References

1945 births
Living people
Members of the Northern Ireland Constitutional Convention
Ulster Unionist Party politicians